Sredna Gora is a mountain range in central Bulgaria, situated south of and parallel to the Balkan Mountains and extending from the Iskar to the west and the elbow of Tundzha north of Yambol to the east. Sredna Gora is 285 km long, reaching 50 km at its greatest width.

The mountain is divided into three parts by the rivers Topolnitsa and Stryama — a western (Ihtimanska Sredna Gora), a central (Sashtinska Sredna Gora) and an eastern part (Sarnena Gora).

Geography

Location and limits 
Sredna Gora is situated in central Bulgaria, south of and parallel to the Balkan Mountains and north of the Upper Thracian Plain. It extends from the river Iskar in the west to the elbow of the river Tundzha north of the city of Yambol in the east. The main orographic ridge extends from west to east, where the mountain range reaches a total length of 285 km; its maximum width from north to south is 50 km. The total area of Sredna Gora is 5,950 km2. Its highest point is the summit of Golyam Bogdan at 1,604 m; the average elevation is 608 m.

It is part of the Srednogorie mountain system that from west to east includes the mountain ranges of Greben (1,156 m in Bulgarian territory), Zavalska (1,181 m), Viskyar (1,136 m), Lyulin (1,256 m), Vitosha (2,290 m), Plana (1,338 m) and Sredna Gora, as well as the heights of Bakadzhitsite and Hisar further east.

To the north, Sredna Gora extends to eight of the eleven Sub-Balkan valleys — from the southeastern limits of the Sofia Valley in the west, eastwards through the valleys of Saranska, Kamarska, Zlatitsa–Pirdop, Karlovo, Kazanlak, Tvarditsa and Sliven. The valleys of Karlovo and Kazanlak are also known as the Rose Valley. Its easternmost point is the elevation of Zaychi Vrah (256 m) along the southwestern limits of the Sliven Valley just southwest of the bend of the river Tundzha. Along its northern borders, Sredna Gora is linked to the Balkan Mountains through five north-south ridges — Negushevski Rid, Oporski Rid, Galabets, Koznitsa and Strazhata.

To the west, the river Iskar and the Pancharevo Gorge separates Sredna Gora from Plana and the ridges Shipochanski Rid and Shumnatitsa link it to the Rila mountain range. From there, its southern limits follow the northern edge of the Konstenets–Dolna Banya Valley to the Momina Klisura Gorge of the river Maritsa to the town of Belovo. From Belovo begins its border with the Upper Thracian Plain, which roughly follows a line through the settlements of Vetren, Kalugerovo, Blatnitsa, Krasnovo, Starosel, Chernichevo and reaching the river Stryama at the village of Pesnopoy. From there it continues further east close to the villages of Varben, Zelenikovo and Veren, from where the Chirpan Heights from a bulge in southern direction to the town of Chirpan and then the mountain range continues eastwards near Stara Zagora, Korten and Kamenovo, reaching the elevation of Zaychi Vrah northwest of Yambol.

Division 

Sredna Gora is divided in three parts by the rivers Topolnitsa and Stryama, both left tributaries of the Maritsa — Ihtimanska Sredna Gora to the west, Sashtinska Sredna Gora in the middle and Sarnena Sredna Gora to the east. 

Ihtimanska Sredna Gora is limited to the west by the valley of the Iskar, to the north by the valleys of Sofia, Saranska, Kamarska and Zlatitsa–Pirdop, to the east by the Topolnitsa, to the south by the Rila mountain range. It is subdivided in three sections — Vakarelsko–Belishki, Shipochansko–Eledzhiski and Ihitmanski. The first section includes the mountains of Lozen (1,190 m) which is the westernmost point of the whole mountain range, Vakarelska (1,090 m) and Belitsa (1,221 m). The river Gabra forms a small valley between Lozen and Vakarelska. Shipochansko–Eledzhiski section is located between the Samokov Valley in the west and the Topolnitsa in the east and links with Rila and Konstenets–Dolna Banya Valley in the south. It includes the ridges of Shipochanski Rid (1,312 m), Shumnatitsa (1,392 m), Septemvriyski (1,275 m) and Eledzhik (1,186 m). Between these two sections is situated the Ihtiman Valley at an altitude of 650 m.

Sashtinska Gredna Gora spans from the valley of the Topolnitsa in the west to the river Stryama in the east. It is limited to the north by the southern reaches of the Zlatitsa–Pirdop and Karlovo valleys, and to the south by the Upper Thracian Valley. It is subdivided in two sections — Bunaysko–Bogdanski and Panagyursko–Strelchanski. The former is the highest past of the mountain range and is located to the north. From west to east it includes the summits of Bratia (1,519 m), Bunaya (1,572 m) and Golyan Bogdan (1,604 m). In its middle is located the high altitude Koprivshtitsa Valley (1,000 m). The elevation lowers to the south into the valleys of the towns of Panagyurishte and Strelcha, as well as the middle courses of the rivers Luda Yana and Pyasachnik.

Sarnena Sredna Gora is the lowest in the range, with most hilly terrain, spanning to the Stryama in the west to the Tundzha in the east. It is limited to the north by the southern reaches of the valleys of Karlovo, Kazanlak, Tvarditsa and Sliven; in the south it gradually descents to the Upper Thracian Plain. There are three sections — Bratanski, Kortenski and Chirpanski. The former is the highest in elevation, spans from the Stryama in the west to the Zmeyovski Pass (430 m) in the east and is dominated by the summit of Bratan (1,236 m). Kortenski section is located eastwards of the Zmeyovski Pass and reaches the easternmost point of the mountain range at Zaychi Vrah; its highest peak in Moruley (895 m). The third section is formed by the Chirpan Heights located south of Bratanski Section, which reaches a maximum heights of 651 m at Kitka.

Prehistoric mine
The copper ore used for the manufacture of the Varna culture artifacts originated from Sredna Gora mines in the hamlet of Mechi Kladenets (Мечи кладенец) 8 km northwest of Stara Zagora. Varna culture flourished in 4400-4100 BC.

Honours
The Srednogorie Heights on Graham Land in Antarctica are named after the Srednogorie Mountain Complex.

See also

Geography of Bulgaria
List of mountains in Bulgaria
List of mountain ranges
Balkan Mountains
Vitosha
Rila
Pirin
Rhodope Mountains

Notes and references

External links

The Sredna Gora and the Valley of the Roses

Mountains of Bulgaria
Landforms of Pazardzhik Province
Landforms of Plovdiv Province
Landforms of Sliven Province
Landforms of Sofia Province
Landforms of Stara Zagora Province